Alexander Cummings McWhorter Pennington, Sr. (July 2, 1810, Newark, New Jersey – January 25, 1867, New York City) was an American Whig Party / Opposition Party politician who represented  in the United States House of Representatives from 1853–1857.

Biography
Born in Newark, New Jersey, July 2, 1810, he attended the United States Military Academy, West Point, New York, from 1826 to 1828. He went on to study law, was admitted to the bar in 1833, and commenced practice in Newark. He was elected a member of the New Jersey General Assembly in 1837 and 1838. He served as alderman of Newark from 1837 to 1840.

Pennington was elected as a Whig to the Thirty-third Congress and reelected as an Opposition Party candidate to the Thirty-fourth Congress, serving in Congress from March 4, 1853, to March 3, 1857. He served as chairman of the Committee on Foreign Affairs in the Thirty-fourth Congress.

After leaving the Congress, he moved to New York City, where he died January 25, 1867.

Family
He was a grand nephew of 6th Governor of New Jersey William Sandford Pennington, and a cousin of 13th New Jersey Governor and 27th Speaker of the U.S. House of Representatives William Pennington. His son, Alexander Cummings McWhorter Pennington, Jr., was a brigadier general in the United States Army and veteran of both the American Civil War and Spanish–American War.

Further reading
 Pennington, Alexander Cummings Macwhorter. Election of speaker. [Washington: Printed at the office of the Congressional Globe, 1856].
 ———. [Speech of] Hon. A. C. M. Pennington, of New Jersey, on the assault by Mr. Brooks on Mr. Sumner. Delivered in the House of Representatives, July 10, 1856. Washington: Printed at the Congressional Globe Office, 1856.

External links

 
 
 Alexander Cumming McWhorter Pennington at The Political Graveyard
 

1810 births
1867 deaths
Politicians from Newark, New Jersey
Whig Party members of the United States House of Representatives from New Jersey
New Jersey Oppositionists
Opposition Party members of the United States House of Representatives from New Jersey
Members of the New Jersey General Assembly
New Jersey lawyers
United States Military Academy alumni
Burials at Mount Pleasant Cemetery (Newark, New Jersey)
19th-century American politicians
Lawyers from Newark, New Jersey
19th-century American lawyers
Military personnel from New Jersey